John W. Lide House, also known as Atkinson House, is a historic home located at Springville, Darlington County, South Carolina.  It was built about 1830–1840, and is a two-story, rectangular, central-hall, frame residence with a low-pitched hip roof. The house features two massive, stuccoed brick, interior chimneys. It is sheathed in weatherboard and sits on a brick pier foundation with brick fill. A full-width, one-story, hip roof porch extends across the entire façade and wraps both side elevations. Also on the property is an antebellum outbuilding.

It was listed on the National Register of Historic Places in 1985.

References

Houses on the National Register of Historic Places in South Carolina
Houses completed in 1835
Houses in Darlington County, South Carolina
National Register of Historic Places in Darlington County, South Carolina